The 1988 Kansas State Wildcats football team represented Kansas State University in the 1988 NCAA Division I-A football season.  The team's head football coach was Stan Parrish.  The Wildcats played their home games in KSU Stadium. They finished with a record of 0–11 overall and 0–7 in Big Eight Conference play, placing last in the conference.  The Wildcats scored 171 points and gave up 448. This was the last season for Stan Parrish; Bill Snyder replaced him in 1989.

Schedule

Personnel

Season summary

Oklahoma

Kansas State's defense gave up a single game NCAA rushing record (768)

References

Kansas State
Kansas State Wildcats football seasons
College football winless seasons
Kansas State Wildcats football